Boisvert River is a tributary of the north shore of Ashuapmushuan Lake, flowing into the unorganized territory of Lac-Ashuapmushuan, Quebec, into the Regional County Municipality (RCM) of Le Domaine-du-Roy, in the administrative region of Saguenay-Lac-Saint-Jean, in Quebec, in Canada.

This river successively crosses the townships of Thibaudeau, Bignell, McCorkill, Rinfret, Vimont, Dollier, Charron and Ducharme. The lower part of the Boisvert River valley runs through the Ashuapmushuan Wildlife Reserve. Forestry is the main economic activity of this valley; recreational tourism activities, second.

The southern part of the Boisvert River valley is served by route 167 which connects Chibougamau to Saint-Félicien, Quebec. Forest Road R1004 (heading northeast) that connects to route 167 serves the northwestern part of the Boisvert River valley and the eastern part of the valley from the Armitage River. The forest road R0210 (North-South direction) serves the eastern part of the valley of the Boisvert River and the valley of the Hogan River. Finally, the R1007 forest road serves the head lake area.

The surface of the Boisvert River is usually frozen from early November to mid-May, however, safe ice circulation is generally from mid-November to mid-April.

Geography

Toponymy 
The term "Boisvert" is a family name of French origin.

The toponym "Boisvert River" was formalized on December 5, 1968, at the Commission de toponymie du Québec, when it was created.

Notes and references

See also 

Rivers of Saguenay–Lac-Saint-Jean
Le Domaine-du-Roy Regional County Municipality